This is a timeline documenting events of Jazz in the year 1988.

Events

March
 25 – The 15th Vossajazz started in Voss, Norway (March 25 – 27).

April
 6 – Jazz guitarist Larry Carlton is shot in a random gun shooting outside his Los Angeles studios.

May
 20 – The 17th Moers Festival started in Moers, Germany (May 20 – 23).
 25 – The 16th Nattjazz started in Bergen, Norway (May 25 – June 8).

June
 30 – The 22nd Montreux Jazz Festival started in Montreux, Switzerland (June 30 – July 16).

July
 1 – The 9th Montreal International Jazz Festival started in Montreal, Quebec, Canada (July 1 – 10).
 8 – The 13th North Sea Jazz Festival started in The Hague, Netherlands (July 8 – 10).

August
 19 – The 5th Brecon Jazz Festival started in Brecon, Wales (April 19 – 21).

September
 16 – The 31st Monterey Jazz Festival started in Monterey, California (September 16 – 18).

Album releases

Bill Frisell: Before We Were Born
Henry Threadgill: Rag, Bush and All
Turtle Island String Quartet: Turtle Island String Quartet
Lyle Mays: Street Dreams
Dave Holland: Triplicate
Jackie McLean: Dynasty
John Carter: Fields
Leni Stern: Secrets
Microscopic Septet: Beauty Based on Science
Music Revelation Ensemble: Music Revelation Ensemble
Willem Breuker: Psalm 122
Steve Turre: Fire and Ice 
Trilok Gurtu: Usfret
Bobby Previte: Claude's Late Morning
Bill Frisell: Lookout for Hope
Misha Mengelberg: Impromptus
Marcus Roberts: Truth is Spoken Here
David Ware: Passage to Music
David Liebman: Trio + One
Freddie Hubbard: Stardust
Gary Thomas: Code Violations
Hilton Ruiz: El Camino
Phil Woods: Evolution
Ralph Moore: Rejuvenate 
Matthew Shipp & Rob Brown: Sonic Explorations

Deaths

 January
 8 – Ray Bauduc, American drummer (born 1906).

 February
 24 – Miff Görling, Swedish bandleader, trombonist, arranger, and composer (born 1909).

March
 1 – Tommy Potter, American upright-bassist (born 1918).
 8 – Ken Colyer, English trumpeter and cornetist (born 1928).
 20 – Gil Evans, Canadian pianist, arranger, composer and bandleader (born 1912).

 April
 3 – Kai Ewans, Danish reedist (born 1906).
 15 – Eliza Doolittle, British singer-songwriter.
 19 – Ed Burke, American violinist and trombonist (born 1909).

May
 13 – Chet Baker, American trumpeter and singer (born 1929).
 28 – Sy Oliver, American trumpeter, singer, composer, arranger and bandleader (born 1910).

July
 2 – Eddie Vinson, American alto saxophonist and blues shouter (born 1917).

 August
 15 – Bill Beason, American drummer (born 1908).
 27 – Irene Higginbotham, African American songwriter and concert pianist (born 1918).

 September
 5 – Lawrence Brown, American trombonist (born 1907).
 27 – J. C. Heard, American drummer (born 1917).

 October
 8 – Edward Inge, American arranger and reedist (born 1906).

 November
 30
 Charlie Rouse, American hard bop tenor saxophonist and flautist (born 1924).
 Pannonica de Koenigswarter, British-born jazz patron and writer (born 1913).

 December
 8
 Gene Quill, American alto saxophonist (born 1927).
 Thore Swanerud, Swedish pianist, vibraphonist, arranger, conductor, and composer (born 1919).

 Unknown date
 Barney Josephson, founder of Café Society in Greenwich Village (born 1902).

Births

 January
 28 – Casimir Liberski, Belgian pianist and keyboarder.

  February
 5 – Fredrik Luhr Dietrichson, Norwegian upright bassist.
 26 – Christian Meaas Svendsen, Norwegian upright bassist.

 April
 1 – Sam Mtukudzi, Zimbabwean saxophonist and guitarist (died 2010).
 22 – Nitcho Reinhardt, French guitarist.

 May
 29 – Kelly Sweet, American singer and songwriter.

 May
 2 – Guilherme Rodrigues, Portuguese composer, improviser, and sound artist.
 7 – David Aleksander Sjølie, Norwegian guitarist.
 17 – Brittany Anjou, American pianist, multi-instrumentalist, and composer.

 July
 31 – Andreas Wildhagen, Norwegian drummer.

 August
 17 – Natalie Sandtorv, Norwegian singer, percussionist, and electronica artist.
 28 – Kjetil Jerve, Norwegian pianist and composer.

 September
 1 – Martina Bárta, Czech singer and French hornist.

 October
 19 – Pasquale Grasso, Italian guitarist.

 November
 25 – Victoria Hart, California-born English singer.
 27 – Sandra Nankoma, Ugandan singer, songwriter and actress.

 December
 3 – Melissa Aldana, Chilean tenor saxophonist.
 23 – Thomai Apergi, Greek singer and guitarist.

 Unknown date
 Jan Martin Gismervik, Norwegian drummer, Monkey Plot.
 Simon Gore, Welch guitarist, keyboarder, composer, and audio/visual artist.

See also

 1980s in jazz
 List of years in jazz
 1988 in music

References

External links 
 History Of Jazz Timeline: 1988 at All About Jazz

Jazz
Jazz by year